Vejen EH is a former team handball club for women from Vejen, Denmark. The club declared its bankrupt the 28. April, 2014 

Vejen EH began as KIF Vejen in 2005, which in KIF Kolding thought that lady team too much stood in the shadow of the successful men's team. By physically move the team to the way it was hoped to attract enough spectators and sponsors to maintain women's team's position in the league.

In 2011 it was decided to completely break with Kolding IF. From the beginning of the season 2013/14 the club changed as to the current name. However, it was difficult to provide sufficient income, and 27 February 2014 the club was very close to closing. They managed to raise capital so the season could be played to completion, but two months after declared the board club for bankruptcy

References

External links
Klubbens hjemmeside

Danish handball clubs